Betrayal (also known as Lady Jayne: Killer) is a thriller film released in 2003. The film stars Erika Eleniak, Julie du Page, Adam Baldwin, James Remar and Louis Mandylor.

Film synopsis
Jayne Ferré (du Page) is a professional assassin that works for the Mafia. When one of her hits goes wrong, she ends up with a suitcase full of a million dollars that belongs to mob boss Frank Bianci (Louis Mandylor). Knowing that he has put a price on her head, Ferré decides to leave Los Angeles and ends up hitching a ride with Kerry, a teenager running from a drug dealer, and his mother, Emily (Eleniak).

After agreeing to cover their expenses, Jayne, Emily, and Kerry head for Texas. During the ride, their car breaks down which forces them to spend a night in a motel. On the night, Kerry discovers Jayne's money and decides to return to LA to pay his debt.

When Jayne finds out, she kidnaps Emily and they go to LA after Kerry to recover her money. Emily manages to escape, and stumbles upon Alex Tyler, an FBI agent who agrees to protect her and to take her to her son.

Cast
 Erika Eleniak as Emily Shaw
 Julie du Page as Jayne Ferré
 Adam Baldwin as Det. Mark Winston
 James Remar as Alex Tyler
 Louis Mandylor as Frank Bianci
 Jeremy Lelliott as Kerry

Release
The film DVD premiered on 2003 in Italy, Netherlands, Finland, Spain, United States, and Germany.

External links

2003 films
American thriller films
Films directed by Mark L. Lester
2003 thriller films
2000s English-language films
2000s American films
Films set in Texas
Films set in Los Angeles